1. FC Kaiserslautern II is the reserve team of German association football club 1. FC Kaiserslautern, based in Kaiserslautern, Rhineland-Palatinate. Historically the team has played as 1. FC Kaiserslautern Amateure until 2005.

The team has reached the first round of the DFB-Pokal, the German Cup, on three occasions, advancing to the second round twice as its best-ever result. The team has played as high as the Regionalliga, courtesy to league titles in the Oberliga Südwest.

History
1. FC Kaiserslautern Amateure made a first appearance in the tier-three Amateurliga Südwest in 1957. It won a league championship in 1960 and 1968 but was not entitled to promotion to professional level. In the seasons in between the team often played against relegation rather than for the league championship, its best other results being runners-up finishes in 1970 and 1973. The latter allowed the team entry to the German amateur football championship where it reached the final where it lost 1–0 to SpVgg Bad Homburg.

In 1978, when the Oberliga Südwest was introduced, the team qualified for this new league which it would belong to, with the exception of the 1982–83 season, until 1992. It won promotion back to the Oberliga in 1983 and 1994 with titles in the Verbandsliga Südwest. The team became a yo-yo team between the Oberliga and the Regionalliga above, a league newly introduced in 1994. It played in the Regionalliga West/Südwest until 2000, in the Regionalliga Süd in 2007 and the Regionalliga West until 2012. It had its best Regionalliga result in the latter when it finished runners-up in 2009. In between the team was relegated from the Regionalliga in 1996, 2000, 2004 and 2007 but each time won promotion back to the league.

In 2012 the team became part of the new Regionalliga Südwest, where they competed until 2017.

The team has also won the Southwestern Cup on three occasions, in 1979, 1997 and 2008, as well as having made a number of losing final appearances. Through this competition it qualified for the first round of the German Cup on three occasions: 1979–80, 1981–82 and 1997–98. It reached the second round twice and, on the third participation, was drawn against its own first team in 1997–98 where it lost 5–0.

Honours
 German amateur football championship
 Runners-up: 1972–73
 Regionalliga West (IV)
 Runners-up: 2008–09
 Amateurliga Südwest (III)
 Winners (2): 1959–60, 1967–68
 Runners-up: 1969–70
 Oberliga Südwest (III-IV)
 Winners (3): 1994–95, 1996–97, 2000–01
 Runners-up (3): 1979–80, 2004–05, 2007–08
 Verbandsliga Südwest (IV)
 Winners (2): 1982–83, 1993–94
 Runners-up: 1992–93
 Oberliga Rheinland-Pfalz/Saar (V)
 Runners-up: 2019–20
 Southwestern Cup 
 Winners (3): 1978–79, 1996–97, 2007–08
 Runners-up (4): 1999–2000, 2001–02, 2002–03, 2006–07

Current squad

Recent seasons
The recent season-by-season performance of the club:

 With the introduction of the Regionalligas in 1994 and the 3. Liga in 2008 as the new third tier, below the 2. Bundesliga, all leagues below dropped one tier. In 2012, the number of Regionalligas was increased from three to five with all Regionalliga Süd clubs except the Bavarian ones entering the new Regionalliga Südwest.

Key

References

External links 
 
 1. FC Kaiserslautern II at Weltfussball.de 

II
German reserve football teams
Rhineland-Palatinate reserve football teams